Sugoi Indeed is the eight studio album from Japanese garage metal trio Electric Eel Shock, released 2009.

Track listing

References

External links
The band's official homepage
Electric Eel Shock's site on Youtube
Electric Eel Shock's site on Myspace

2009 albums
Electric Eel Shock albums